Willits Depot is a historic train station in Willits, California. It is served by California Western Railroad, the Skunk Train excursion line to Ft. Bragg.

History
The Northwestern Pacific Railroad reached Willits by 1901, and passenger service to the original station began in 1902. That station was demolished in 1915 and rebuilt in its current location; a parking lot sits on the site of the original.

The depot was added to the National Register of Historic Places on October 20, 1999, as Willits Depot

References

External links
 Skunk Train

Railway stations in the United States opened in 1902
Railway stations in the United States opened in 1915
Railway stations on the National Register of Historic Places in California
Railway stations in Mendocino County, California
Amtrak Thruway Motorcoach stations in California
Former Northwestern Pacific Railroad stations